The 2019 Ilkley Trophy was a professional tennis tournament played on outdoor grass courts. It was the fifth edition of the tournament which was part of the 2019 ATP Challenger Tour and the 2019 ITF Women's World Tennis Tour. It took place in Ilkley, United Kingdom between 17 and 23 June 2019.

Men's singles main-draw entrants

Seeds

 1 Rankings are as of 10 June 2019.

Other entrants
The following players received wildcards into the main draw:
  Liam Broady
  Jan Choinski
  Evan Hoyt
  Paul Jubb
  Ryan Peniston

The following player received entry into the singles main draw as an alternate:
  Go Soeda

The following players received entry from the qualifying draw:
  Viktor Galović
  Brydan Klein

The following player received entry as a lucky loser:
  Evgeny Karlovskiy

Women's singles main-draw entrants

Seeds

 1 Rankings are as of 10 June 2019.

Other entrants
The following players received wildcards into the singles main draw:
  Maia Lumsden
  Katie Swan
  Gabriella Taylor

The following players received entry from the qualifying draw:
  Robin Anderson
  Verónica Cepede Royg
  Jana Čepelová
  Martina Di Giuseppe
  Lesley Kerkhove
  Marta Kostyuk

Champions

Men's singles

 Dominik Köpfer def.  Dennis Novak 3–6, 6–3, 7–6(7–5).

Women's singles

 Monica Niculescu def.  Tímea Babos, 6–2, 4–6, 6–3

Men's doubles

 Santiago González /  Aisam-ul-Haq Qureshi def.  Marcus Daniell /  Leander Paes 6–3, 6–4.

Women's doubles

 Beatriz Haddad Maia /  Luisa Stefani def.  Ellen Perez /  Arina Rodionova, 6–4, 6–7(5–7), [10–4]

References

External links
 2019 Ilkley Trophy at ITFtennis.com
 Official website

2019 ATP Challenger Tour
2019 ITF Women's World Tennis Tour
2019 in English tennis
June 2019 sports events in the United Kingdom
2019